Alucita debilella is a moth of the family Alucitidae. It is found in Spain.

References

Moths described in 1994
Alucitidae
Moths of Europe